INSAT-2D was an Indian communications satellite. Launched on 4 June 1997, and similar to INSAT-2C, INSAT-2D went out of order on October 4, 1997, because of a power inconsistency problem and was later replaced by INSAT-2DT, an in-orbit satellite which was previously known as ARABSAT-1C. The main aim of the satellite was improved communication. In the INSAT-2 (Indian National Satellite System) series, INSAT-2D was the fourth consecutive communication satellite. The satellite was launched using an Ariane 4 rocket from French Guiana.

The satellite was placed into geostationary orbit at an inclination of 93.5 degrees east. The satellite was expected to have a nominal lifespan of around 7–9 years. The onboard power of the satellite was estimated to be 1,650 watts.

Its communication payload consisted of 16C-band transponders (extended C-band, for fixed-satellite service), two high-power C-band transponders (for broadcasting-satellite service, BSS), one S-band transponder (for BSS), one C/S-band mobile communication transponder, and three Ku-band transponders.

References

INSAT satellites
Spacecraft launched in 1997
1997 in India
1997 in spaceflight
Derelict satellites orbiting Earth